Karl Clive Gordon, known by the stage name K-Gee, is a British DJ, producer, rapper and songwriter and former member of the Outlaw Posse.

Gordon was brought up listening to reggae by his father and was inspired to become a DJ after listening to Grandmaster Flash's "The Message" and other early hip-hop tracks.

K-Gee and his friend Bello decided to start Outlaw Posse  and one of his demo tapes ended up at Richie Rich and in 1990 the debut single "Party" was released and later the album My Afros on Fire. In 1992, the second album The Oneness of Two Minds in Unison was released, however the band split up and K-Gee returned to being a DJ.

In May 1996, K-Gee met Melanie Blatt and Shaznay Lewis who were formerly in All Saints 1.9.7.5., and wanted to relaunch their group with their new-found bandmembers Natalie and Nicole Appleton. Together they recorded "I Know Where It's At" and after All Saints managed to land a recording contract, he co-wrote and produced their first album, All Saints. The album turned out to be successful and scored three consecutive number 1 hits in the United Kingdom. K-Gee accompanied them on their tour and was widely regarded as their fifth member.

The success allowed K-Gee to do production and songwriting for other bands as well. K-Gee has worked with TQ, Carl Thomas, Gabrielle, Rod Stewart, Hinda Hicks, Noreaga, George Michael, Pras, Glamma Kid, Jamie Cullum, Jessie J and Esmée Denters.

In 2000, K-Gee signed to independent record label Instant Karma. On 23 October 2000, K-Gee released his debut single "I Don't Really Care", which peaked at No. 22 on the UK Singles Chart. His debut album Bounce to This was released on 7 October 2002.

Discography

Albums
Solo
 Bounce to This (7 October 2002)

With other artists
 My Afros on Fire with Outlaw Posse (1990)
 The Oneness of II Minds in Unison with Brothers Like Outlaw (1992)

Singles
Solo
 "I Don't Really Care" (2000) – UK #22
 "Stay True" (2001)
 "Upside Down" (2002) – UK #92

With other bands
 "The Original Dope!" with Outlaw Posse (1989)
 "Party" with Outlaw Posse (1990)
 "Stop the Negativity" with Outlaw Posse (1990)
 "Party Time" with Outlaw (1992)

Production and remixes
 All Saints (Number 2, 24 November 1997) by All Saints
 New Direction (1998) by Adeva
 Right Here, Right Now (1999) by Fierce
 Bills 2 Pay (1999) by Glamma Kid
 Saints & Sinners (Number 1, 14 October 2000) by All Saints
 Open (19 July 2004) by Shaznay Lewis
 Outside: The Mixes by George Michael
 Studio 1 (2006) by All Saints
 We Run Things (2009) by Jamie Cullum
 Stand Up (2011) by Jessie J
 Screaming Out Loud (2012) by Esmée Denters

References

External links
 Official K-Gee website

English DJs
English record producers
English songwriters
Black British DJs
Black British male rappers
Living people
Year of birth missing (living people)